Barnt Green Spartak Football Club is a football club representing the village of Barnt Green, near Bromsgrove, in Worcestershire, England.

History
The club was established in 1992 as a Sunday league team under the name Spar Barnt Green, joining Division One of the Bromsgrove & District League. In their first season they won the Gordon Bridgwater Cup and the LMS Shield. They retained the LMS Shield the following season, before the 1994–95 season saw them finish as runners-up in Division One, as well as winning the Gordon Bridgwater Cup, the LMS Shield and the Advertiser & Messenger Cup.

In 1997 the club joined Division Three of the Midland Combination as Barnt Green Spartak. After finishing eighth in 1999–2000, they were promoted to Division Two. The club went on to win Division Two in 2002–03, earning promotion to Division One. The following season saw them win Division One at the first attempt, resulting in promotion to the Premier Division. They won the Worcestershire Senior Urn in 2006–07, beating Alvechurch 2–1 in the final. In 2008 the club was renamed GSA Sports. However, they left the league at the end of the 2009–10 season.

Barnt Green Spartak was re-established in 2012 and joined Division Two of the Midland Combination. After winning the division in 2012–13 they were promoted to Division One. The Midland Combination merged with the Midland Alliance in 2014 to form the Midland League, with Barnt Green placed in Division Two.

Ground
After groundsharing with Alvechurch at Lye Meadow, the club moved to Sporting Khalsa's Abbey Park Stadium in Bloxwich in 2009.  When the club was reformed in 2012, home games were initially played at Pilkington XXX.  The club subsequently moved to the Coppice, the home ground of Highgate United before relocating to Earlswood Town's Pavilions ground prior to the 2018–19 season.

Honours
Midland Combination
Division One champions 2003–04
Division Two champions 2002–03, 2012–13
Bromsgrove & District League
Gordon Bridgwater Cup winners 1992–93, 1994–95
LMS Shield winners 1992–93, 1993–94, 1994–95
Advertiser & Messenger Cup winners 1994–95
Worcestershire Senior Urn
Winners 2006–07

Records 
Best FA Cup performance: Preliminary round, 2007–08
Best FA Vase performance: Second round, 2004–05

See also
Barnt Green Spartak F.C. players

References

External links

Football clubs in England
Football clubs in Worcestershire
Association football clubs established in 1992
1992 establishments in England
Midland Football Combination
Midland Football League